The following television stations broadcast on digital channel 51 in the United States:

 K51DR-D in Wenatchee, Washington
 KHFD-LD in Dallas, Texas, to move to channel 13, on virtual channel 51
 KXAD-LD in Amarillo, Texas, to move to channel 23

The following stations, which are no longer licensed, formerly broadcast on digital channel 51:
 K51AQ-D in Ukiah, California
 W51CW-D in Wilmington, North Carolina

References

51 digital TV stations in the United States